Ulf Ekstam (born 30 April 1941) is a Finnish former alpine skier who competed in the 1964 Winter Olympics and 1968 Winter Olympics.

External links
 sports-reference.com

1941 births
Living people
Finnish male alpine skiers
Olympic alpine skiers of Finland
Alpine skiers at the 1964 Winter Olympics
Alpine skiers at the 1968 Winter Olympics
Universiade medalists in alpine skiing
Universiade silver medalists for Finland
Competitors at the 1962 Winter Universiade
20th-century Finnish people